Pentre Platform railway station served the village of Pentre, in the historical county of Glamorgan, Wales, from 1904 to 1912 on the Rhondda Valley Branch of the Taff Vale Railway.

History
The station was opened in October 1904 by the Taff Vale Railway. It closed in November 1912 as that was when it was last in the timetables.

References

Disused railway stations in Rhondda Cynon Taf
Former Taff Vale Railway stations
Railway stations in Great Britain opened in 1904
Railway stations in Great Britain closed in 1912
1904 establishments in Wales
1912 disestablishments in Wales